Sanguine is a red pigment.

Sanguine may also refer to:

 Sanguine, a personality type, one of the four temperaments
 Sanguine (band), an alt-metal band
 Sanguine (heraldry), a tincture in heraldry
 Sanguine (transmitter), an antenna of the US Navy
 Sanguine, a fruit, type of blood orange
 HMS Sanguine (P266), a submarine
 Project Sanguine, a research project for radio communication with submarines

See also 
 5081 Sanguin